In an out-of-competition attempt to break the world record in the snatch, both Aimé Terme of France and Mohamed Tarabulsi of Lebanon attempted to lift 146.5 kg to break the world record, both competitors failed the lift.  Yossef Romano of Israel was one of the victims of the 5 September 1972, Munich Massacre.

Results
Total of best lifts in military press, snatch and jerk.  Ties are broken by the lightest bodyweight.

Final

Key: WR = world record; OR = Olympic record; DNF = did not finish; NVL = no valid lift

References

External links
Official report

Weightlifting at the 1972 Summer Olympics